Shapurdukhtak (Middle Persian: Šābuhrduxtag, literally "daughter of Shapur") was a 3rd-century Sasanian queen (banbishn). She was the wife of her cousin, king Bahram II (r. 274–293).

Biography 
She was the only daughter of Shapur Meshanshah, a Sasanian prince who governed Meshan, and was the son of the Sasanian shah Shapur I. Her mother was a queen named Denag. Shapurdukhtak had many brothers: Hormizdag, Odabakht, Bahram, Shapur, Peroz, and Hormizd. She was probably raised in Meshan, which was then governed by her father. In 260, her father died and was probably succeeded by Denag as the governor of Meshan.

In 274, her cousin Bahram II ascended the throne, and she was shortly married to the latter, and was given the title of bānbishnān bānbishn, meaning "queen of queens". In c. 281, her brother Hormizd revolted against Bahram II, and was supported by the inhabitants of Eastern Iran, including the inhabitants of Gilan. Hormizd's revolt was finally suppressed in 283, and he was shortly executed under the orders of Bahram II, who appointed his and Shapurdukhtak's own son Bahram III as the governor of Sakastan.

Shapurdukhtak is also portrayed on rock reliefs along with Bahram II. One of the reliefs is situated at Sar Mashhad south of Kazerun, which portrays Bahram as a hunter who has slayed a lion whilst throwing his sword at another. Shapurdukhtak is holding his right hand in a signal of safeguard, whilst Kartir and another figure, most likely a prince, are watching. The scenery has been the subject of several symbolic and metaphorical meanings, thought it is most likely supposed to portray a simple royal display of braveness during a real-life hunt. The other relief at Naqsh-e Rostam, portrays Bahram II standing whilst being surrounded by his family members and attendants; to his left are the sculptures of Shapurdukhtak, a prince, the crown prince Bahram III, Kartir, and Narseh. To his right are the sculptures of Papak, and two other grandees.

Bahram II also minted several contains showing a portrait of himself along with Shapurdukhtak and Bahram III. Shapurdukhtak is wearing different headdress' on some of the coins, sometimes with a boar, griffin, horse or eagle. The precise meaning of this, however, is unclear. She seems to have still been living at the time of her husband's death in 293, and probably died some years later.

References

Sources
 
 
 
 
 

3rd-century Iranian people
Sasanian queens
3rd-century births
Year of death unknown